Gmina Poświętne is a rural gmina (administrative district) in Opoczno County, Łódź Voivodeship, in central Poland.

The gmina covers s. As of 2006 its total population is 3,318.

The gmina contains part of the protected area called Spała Landscape Park.

Villages
Gmina Poświętne contains the villages and settlements of Anielin, Brudzewice, Brudzewice-Kolonia, Buczek, Dęba, Dęborzeczka, Fryszerka, Gapinin, Gapinin-Kolonia, Kozłowiec, Małoszyce, Mysiakowiec, Ponikła, Poręby, Poświętne, Stefanów, Studzianna and Wólka Kuligowska.

Neighbouring gminas
Gmina Poświętne is bordered by the gminas of Drzewica, Inowłódz, Odrzywół, Opoczno and Rzeczyca.

References
Polish official population figures 2006

Poswietne
Opoczno County